The Malagasy passport is issued to citizens of Madagascar for international travel.

As of 1 January 2017, Malagasy citizens had visa-free or visa on arrival access to 50 countries and territories, ranking the Malagasy passport 86th in terms of travel freedom (tied with Gabonese and Haitian passports) according to the Henley visa restrictions index.

See also
Visa requirements for Malagasy citizens
List of passports

References

Passports by country
Politics of Madagascar